Randy Pearl Albelda (born 1955) is an American feminist economist, activist, author, and academic who specialises in poverty and gender issues.

Background
Albelda attended Smith College, where she received a B.A. in Economics in 1977, followed by a Ph.D. in Economics from the University of Massachusetts Amherst. In 1983 her first paper was published researching the determinants of women's wages during the Progressive era.

Albelda became a professor at University of Massachusetts Boston in Economics in 1988. She has worked as research director of the Massachusetts State Senate's Taxation Committee and the legislature's Special Commission on Tax Reform. She became an associate editor for the journal Feminist Economics in 2004, an editorial associate for Dollars & Sense magazine in 1986, and was a co-founder of Academics Working Group on Poverty in Massachusetts in 1995, remaining until 1999.

Representative publications

Her works include:

Mink Coats Don’t Trickle Down: The Economic Attack on Women and People of Color (1987; co-authored with Elaine McCrate, Edwin Melendez, and June Lapidus)
Glass Ceilings and Bottomless Pits (1997; co-authored with Chris Tilly)
Economics and Feminism: Disturbances in the Field (1997)
Dilemmas of Lone Motherhood: Essay from Feminist Economics (2005; co-authored with Susan Himmelweit and Jane Humphries). This book was previously published as a special issue of the journal Feminist Economics.

Bibliography

See also 
 Feminist economics
 List of feminist economists

References

External links 

 Home page International Association for Feminist Economics (IAFFE)
Home page Feminist Economics journal

1955 births
American women economists
21st-century American economists
American anti-poverty advocates
Feminist economists
Living people
University of Massachusetts Boston faculty
Smith College alumni
University of Massachusetts Amherst College of Social and Behavioral Sciences alumni
American people of Bulgarian descent
21st-century American women